Curcija or Ćurčija is a surname from the Slavic-speaking region of the Balkans. The name translates to "furrier". 
Đorđe Ćurčija (died 1804), Serbian military commander
Michael Curcija (born 1977), Australian football striker

Serbian surnames